The Gilera DNA is a motorcycle produced by Gilera from 1996 to 2009.

Description
The Gilera DNA is available in 50 cc, 125 cc, and 180 cc variants. It features a continuously variable transmission along with an electronic start. The 50 cc engine is a 2-stroke, while the 125 cc and 180 cc models are 4-stroke, all are single cylinder.

In 2005 Gilera released the 'RST' model which replaced the handlebars with a different design and featured a new colour scheme. This model was discontinued by Gilera in 2009].

The 125 cc bike was nominated for the "Machine of the Year" award by Motorcycle News in 2001.

References

Gilera motorcycles